The Mukutmanipur Dam is a dam in Khatra subdivision of Bankura district in the state of West Bengal, India.

The Kangsabati River (also variously known as the Kasai and Cossye) rises from the Chota Nagpur Plateau in West Bengal, and passes through the districts of Purulia, Bankura and Paschim Medinipur district in West Bengal before draining in the Bay of Bengal,  from Mukutmonipur. It is the second longest earthen dam in India (11.27 kms), next only to Sri Ram Sagar Project (SRSP) Telangana, with a gross storage capacity of 1.04 cubic kms (36.73 tmcft). It is the only dam that has been designated as 'Dam of national importance' from West Bengal by Central Water Commission of Government of India.

In the middle, there is a small hillock called Paresnath hill where several statues of Jain and Hindu deities are kept in the open air. These statues were recovered during digging while the dam was built. There is another Jain statue lying at the bottom of the Pareshnath hill.

Accessibility

There are many trains regularly available from Howrah railway station to Bankura Railway Station. Its about 233 kilometers from Howrah railway station. Then one has to take a bus from Bankura Railway Station, by bus it is 72 kilometers from there.

References

Dams in West Bengal
Tourist attractions in Bankura district
Year of establishment missing